The plain-colored tanager (Tangara inornata) is a species of bird in the family Thraupidae. It is found in Colombia, Costa Rica, and Panama. Its natural habitats are subtropical or tropical moist lowland forests and heavily degraded former forest.

References

Further reading

plain-colored tanager
Birds of Costa Rica
Birds of Panama
Birds of Colombia
plain-colored tanager
plain-colored tanager
Taxonomy articles created by Polbot